Birthcare Center is a South Korean television series starring Uhm Ji-won, Park Ha-sun, Jang Hye-jin, Yoon Park and Choi Ri. The series directed by Park Su-won and written by Kim Ji-Soo revolves around Oh Hyun-jin (Uhm Ji-won), as she gets acquainted to child birth and postpartum care. It aired on tvN every Monday and Tuesday at 21:00 (KST) from November 2 to November 24, 2020.

As per Nielsen Korea, Birthcare Center ended with the audience rating of an average of 3.690%	in national and 4.019% in the metropolitan area. In its last episode it recorded averages of  4.8% in the metropolitan area and 4.2% nationwide with a viewership of 1.1 million, which was its personal best. With an average viewership of 889,000 it maintained the No.1 rank in the same time zone including cable and full-length channels.

Synopsis
Oh Hyun-jin (Uhm Ji-won) has a glittering career in her work life. She is the youngest member on the board of executives at the company she works at and is proficient in everything she does. But when she delivers her first child, she is in for a shock. Giving birth was far more difficult than she had expected, and she quickly discovers that although she is good at all things work-related, she hasn’t got the first clue about how to bring up a baby. After being discharged from hospital, she heads to a postpartum care center – an exclusive establishment where even A-list stars come to get postpartum care. She is dismayed to realize that she is the oldest mother in the center, and embarrassed to notice that everyone else seems to know what they are doing when it comes to looking after babies. Fortunately, the other mothers at the center prove inspirational. Among their number is Cho Eun-jeong (Park Ha-sun ), aka 'the Queen Bee' – a seemingly perfect mother whom everyone wants to befriend in order to learn childcare secrets. And Choi Hye-suk (Jang Hye-jin) is the charismatic center manager, having knowledge about everything related to childcare.

Cast
Cast and characters profile:

Main

 Uhm Ji-won as Oh Hyun-jin, the oldest mother and the youngest charismatic executive, who doesn't hold back. However her inexperience in having baby makes her felt culturally shock with the world of the mothers, in which no one cares about her job or educational  background but her baby. Her inexperienced makes her being outcasted by the rest of the mother.
 Park Ha-sun as Cho Eun-jeong, perfect parenting heart and "Love is Mother", a so-called first class mom who breastfeeds twins for 24 months. Everyone is willing to befriend her for her perfect parenting tips. However actually her twins are not as nice as what people see.
 Jang Hye-jin as Choi Hye-suk, president of the mothers and the director of the postpartum care center she is trusted by mothers as guide
 Yoon Park as Kim Do-yoon, Hyun-jin's handsome younger husband, CEO of  an up-and-coming app development startup company.
 Choi Ri as Lee Roo-da, Yo-mi's mother who thinks of herself as much as she thinks of her child. She have strong clash with most of the mothers in the center, especially against Eun-jeong.

Supporting
 Choi Soo-min as Ahn Hee-nam, a nurse in a postpartum care center whose voice changes suddenly with Jekyll and Hyde level. She uses her normal lower voice to talk to the mothers, while she uses nasal higher voice as sarcasm to incompetent mothers.
 Kim Min-chul as Min-soo
 Nam Yoon-su as Ha Gyeong-hoon, a handsome packet delivery boy whose presence is waited by the center's mothers and employees except Eun-jeong because he knows the secret about her twins' attitude.
 Lim Hwa-young as Park Yoon-ji
 Bae Woo-hee as Hee-won, junior to Do-yoon

Special appearances
 Kang Hong-seok as Grim Reaper, he almost takes Hyun-jin during her difficult delivery (Ep. 1)
 Jung Moon-sung as a resident specializing in obstetrics and gynecology who delivers Hyun-jin's baby (Ep. 1)
 Lee Jun-hyeok as Yang Joon-seok, a father at Serenity Birthcare Center who gives advice to Do-yoon (Ep. 2 & 5)
 Jung Yi-rang as a saleswoman who tries to sell a baby stroller to Do-yoon (Ep. 3)
 Park Si-yeon as Han Hyo-rin, an actress who struggles with her public image after giving birth (Ep. 4)
 So Joo-yeon as Alex Choi, a colleague and rival of Hyun-jin (Ep. 6)
 Kim Jae-hwa as Byun Young-mi, a selective babysitter known as the "Crouching Dragon" (Ep. 6)
 Jung Sang-hoon as a shaman who helps parents choose successful names for their children (Ep. 7)
 Cha Tae-hyun as Cha Tae-hyun, Ahn Hee-nam's son (Ep. 8)
 Jung Hee-tae as Roo-da's father, he abandoned his family when his daughter was young (Ep. 8)
 Yoo Ha-bok as Hyun-jin's boss (Ep. 8)
 Jung Soon-won, a prosecutor in Hyun-jin's imagination (Ep. 8)

Episodes

Production
The first script reading took place on May 6, 2020. Lim Hwa-young joined the cast in late May.

The promotional stills and teasers were released on October 15, 2020.

The series is available for streaming with English and Mandarin subtitles on iQIYI in South East Asia and Taiwan.

Original soundtrack

Part 1

Part 2

Part 3

Score

Viewership

Awards and nominations

References

External links
  
 Birthcare Center at Daum 
 
 
 

TVN (South Korean TV channel) television dramas
2020 South Korean television series debuts
2020 South Korean television series endings
Korean-language television shows
South Korean melodrama television series
South Korean medical television series
Pregnancy-themed television shows
Television series by RaemongRaein